This article displays the qualifying draw of the 2011 Open 13.

Players

Seeds

Qualifiers

Qualifying draw

First qualifier

Second qualifier

Third qualifier

Fourth qualifier

References
 Qualifying Draw

2011 - qualifying
Open 13 - qualifying